The following outline is provided as an overview of and topical guide to the U.S. state of Maryland:

Maryland – U.S. state located in the Mid Atlantic region of the United States, bordering Virginia, West Virginia, and the District of Columbia to its south and west; Pennsylvania to its north; and Delaware to its east. Maryland was the seventh state to ratify the United States Constitution, and three nicknames for it (the Old Line State, the Free State, and the Chesapeake Bay State) are occasionally used. The state's most populated city is Baltimore. Its capital is Annapolis.

General reference 

 Names
 Common name: Maryland
 Pronunciation: 
 Official name: State of Maryland
 Abbreviations and name codes
 Postal symbol:  MD
 ISO 3166-2 code:  US-MD
 Internet second-level domain:  .md.us
 Nicknames
 America in Miniature
 Chesapeake State
 Cockade State
 Crab State
 Free State
 Monumental State
 Old Line State
 Oyster State
 Queen State
 Terrapin State
 Adjectival: Maryland
 Demonym: Marylander

Geography of Maryland 

Geography of Maryland
 Maryland is: a U.S. state, a federal state of the United States of America
 Location
 Northern hemisphere
 Western hemisphere
 Americas
 North America
 Anglo America
 Northern America
 United States of America
 Contiguous United States
 Eastern United States
 East Coast of the United States
 Mid-Atlantic states
 South Atlantic States
 Southern United States
 South Atlantic States
 Population of Maryland:  5,773,552 (2010 U.S. Census)
 Area of Maryland:
 Atlas of Maryland

Places in Maryland 

 Historic places in Maryland
 Ghost towns in Maryland
 National Historic Landmarks in Maryland
 National Register of Historic Places listings in Maryland
 Bridges on the National Register of Historic Places in Maryland
 National Natural Landmarks in Maryland
 National parks in Maryland
 State parks in Maryland

Environment of Maryland 

 Climate of Maryland
 Geology of Maryland
 Protected areas of Maryland
 State forests of Maryland
 Superfund sites in Maryland
 Wildlife of Maryland
 Flora of Maryland
 Fauna of Maryland
 Birds of Maryland
 Maryland BayStat

Natural geographic features of Maryland 

 Islands of Maryland
 Lakes of Maryland
 Mountains of Maryland
 Rivers of Maryland

Regions of Maryland 

 Central Maryland
 Eastern Maryland
 Southern Maryland
 Western Maryland

Administrative divisions of Maryland 

 The 23 counties of the state of Maryland
 Municipalities in Maryland
 Cities in Maryland
 State capital of Maryland: Annapolis
 City nicknames in Maryland
 Sister cities in Maryland
 Towns in Maryland
 Unincorporated communities in Maryland
 Census-designated places in Maryland

Demography of Maryland 

Demographics of Maryland

Government and politics of Maryland 

Politics of Maryland
 Form of government: U.S. state government
 United States congressional delegations from Maryland
 Maryland State Capitol
 Elections in Maryland
 Electoral reform in Maryland
 Political party strength in Maryland

Branches of the government of Maryland 

Government of Maryland

Executive branch of the government of Maryland 
 Governor of Maryland
 Lieutenant Governor of Maryland
 Secretary of State of Maryland
 State Treasurer of Maryland
 State departments
 Maryland Department of Transportation

Legislative branch of the government of Maryland 

 Maryland General Assembly (bicameral)
 Upper house: Maryland Senate
 Lower house: Maryland House of Delegates

Judicial branch of the government of Maryland 

Courts of Maryland
 Supreme Court of Maryland

Law and order in Maryland 

Law of Maryland
 Cannabis in Maryland
 Capital punishment in Maryland
 Individuals executed in Maryland
 Constitution of Maryland
 Crime in Maryland
 Gun laws in Maryland
 Law enforcement in Maryland
 Law enforcement agencies in Maryland
 Maryland State Police
 Prisons in Maryland
 Same-sex marriage in Maryland

Military in Maryland 

 Maryland Air National Guard
 Maryland Army National Guard

History of Maryland 

History of Maryland

History of Maryland, by period 

Prehistory of Maryland
Indigenous peoples
English Colony of Maryland, 1632–1694
History of slavery in Maryland
Maryland Toleration Act, 1649
English Province of Maryland, 1694–1707
British Province of Maryland, 1707–1776
French and Indian War, 1754–1763
Treaty of Paris of 1763
British Indian Reserve (in present Garrett County), 1763–1783
Royal Proclamation of 1763
Mason–Dixon line, 1763–1767
American Revolutionary War, April 19, 1775 – September 3, 1783
United States Declaration of Independence, July 4, 1776
Treaty of Paris, September 3, 1783
State of Maryland since 1776
Thirteenth state to ratify the Articles of Confederation and Perpetual Union, signed March 1, 1781
Seventh State to ratify the Constitution of the United States of America on April 26, 1788
War of 1812, June 18, 1812 – March 23, 1815
Battle of Bladensburg, 1814
Battle of Baltimore, 1814
Treaty of Ghent, December 24, 1814
Mexican–American War, April 25, 1846 – February 2, 1848
Baltimore Plot, 1861
American Civil War, April 12, 1861 – May 13, 1865
Maryland in the American Civil War
Border state, 1861–1865
Maryland Campaign, September 4–20, 1862
Battle of Antietam, September 17, 1862
Gettysburg Campaign, June 9 – July 14, 1863

History of Maryland, by region 

 by city
 History of Baltimore
 History of Cumberland, Maryland
 History of Frederick, Maryland
 by county
 History of Garrett County, Maryland

History of Maryland, by subject 

 History of MTA Maryland
 History of Maryland Route 200

Culture of Maryland 

Culture of Maryland
 Museums in Maryland
 Religion in Maryland
 Episcopal Diocese of Maryland
 Scouting in Maryland
 State symbols of Maryland
 Flag of the State of Maryland 
 Great Seal of the State of Maryland

The Arts in Maryland 
 Music of Maryland
 Theater in Maryland

Sports in Maryland 

Sports in Maryland
 Professional sports teams in Maryland

Economy and infrastructure of Maryland 

Economy of Maryland
 Business in Maryland
 Communications in Maryland
 Newspapers in Maryland
 Radio stations in Maryland
 Television stations in Maryland
 Health care in Maryland
 Hospitals in Maryland
 Transportation in Maryland
 Airports in Maryland
 Roads in Maryland
 U.S. Highways in Maryland
 Interstate Highways in Maryland
 State highways in Maryland

Education in Maryland 

Education in Maryland
 Schools in Maryland
 School districts in Maryland
 High schools in Maryland
 Colleges and universities in Maryland
 University of Maryland, College Park

See also 

Topic overview:
Maryland

Index of Maryland-related articles

References

External links 

Maryland
Maryland